is a Japanese model and actor. He is known for his roles in Still Walking, Chocolate, and Godzilla 2000: Millennium.

Biography
Modelling period

Abe was born in Yokohama as the youngest in a family of three children. He attended Yokohama Mitsuzawa elementary school, then Yokohama City Matsumoto Junior High School, then Kanagawa Prefectural Hakusan High School. After retaking the university entrance examinations once, he attended the Department for Electrical Engineering in the Faculty of Science and Technology of Chuo University in Tokyo and graduated with a degree in electrical engineering. In 1985 while in college he applied to the "Shueisha 3rd Nonno Boyfriend Award" and won the championship because his sister recommended the award. Since then, during his university days, he was a charismatic model for magazines such as Men's Non-no and Nonno.  He later transitioned from modelling into acting.

Unfavourable times

He made his debut as an actor in the movie Haikara-San: Here Comes Miss Modern (1987) - in which he co-starred with Yoko Minamino, a popular idol of the time whom Abe himself was a fan of, and received an autograph. He also released an album in 1988 as a pop idol.
After that year he mainly worked as an actor, but because of his title and appearance as a model he was given only secondary and mundane roles (he said he was "riding with a Ferrari"). Furthermore, there was the problem that it was difficult to take a double shot with a woman because of his height. Gradually, the work in drama decreased, and he suffered from a big feeling of impatience. 
He was not blessed with work for three years and made a living from pachinko. Around this time he started ancient martial arts which led to later work. Also he invested in an apartment. Due to the decline in real estate values as a result of the bursting of the bubble economy, and the decline in his popularity, he was left with a large debt. He was the target of the variety show What is that person now? which searched for "the celebrity that once dominated the world". According to his book, when he heard that Ken Takakura starred in the NHK drama Chihoru's Elegy in 1992, he wanted to appear even in an unnamed bit part, and he tried to get it even though it was a small part. 

Turning Point

In 1993 he starred as a bisexual detective director in Atami Murder Case Monte Carlo Illusion written and directed by Kohei Tsuka. 
In 1994 he co-starred in Shinoidare (directed by Tatsuoki Hosono) with Koji Yakusho and received the Special Award at the Japanese Professional Movie Awards in combination with film Kyouju Luger P08. 
Starting with playing the role of the talented Rōjū Matsudaira Norisato in the 1995 NHK Taiga drama Hachidai Shogun Yoshimune, the number of appearances in historical dramas increased over time, especially in the Taiga dramas Genroku Ryoran(1999), Musashi MUSASH (2003), Yoshitsune (2005) and Tenchijin (2009).

Another breakthrough

In 2000, he secured a leading role in the dramaTRICK, in which he co-starred with Yukie Nakama, he played the role thoroughly and used many photographs of his modelling era as self-deprecation material. In addition, he starred in the movie The Summer of the Ubume which was based on the novel of the same name written by Natsuhiko Kyogoku, and as a result, he help working on postwork of Natsuhiko Kyogoku's book Hyakki Tsurezure Bukuro - Ame which is also inspired by the movie. He wrote his impressions of appearing in this movie. 

His performance in the TV drama The Man Who Can't Get Married won the FNS Good Work Grand Prize in 2006. 

Popular at the time of the economy bubble, he appeared in the movie Bubble Fiction: Boom or Bust released in 2007. 

He took the voicing role of Kenshiro for the animated movie Fist of the North Star: The Legends of the True Savior released on 11th March 2006.

In 2009, Abe won the Best Actor award in the 63rd Mainichi Film Award for his performances in Still Walking and Aoi Tori. Abe also starred in Hideki Takeuchi's Thermae Romae. He then played a supporting role in Hirokazu Kore-eda's I Wish.

Filmography

Films

 Haikara-San: Here Comes Miss Modern (1987)
 YAWARA! (1989)
 Spirit Warrior (1990)
 Yamato Takeru (1994)
 Moon Over Tao (1997)
 Hissatsu! Shamisenya no Yuji (1999)
 Godzilla 2000: Millennium (1999)
 Tokyo Raiders (2000)
 Crazy Lips (2000)
 Blood Sucking Space (2001)
 Rush! (2001)
 Platonic Sex (2001)
 Trick (2002)
 Hana and Alice (2004)
 Hotel Venus (2004)
 Survive Style 5+ (2004)
 My Lover is a Sniper: The Movie (2004)
 Hasami Otoko (2004)
 Ubume no Natsu (2005)
 Legend of Raoh: Chapter of Love in Death (2006)
 Trick 2 (2006)
 The Ode to Joy (2006)
 Forbidden Siren (2006)
 Bubble Fiction: Boom or Bust (2007)
 Hero (2007)
 Taitei no Ken (2007)
 Happy Ever After (2007)
 Legend of Yuria (2007)
 Legend of Raoh: Chapter of Fierce Fighting (2007) - Raoh (voice)
 Legend of Toki (2008)
 Zero: Legend of Kenshiro (2008)
 Team Batista no Eikō (2008)
 Chocolate (2008)
 Mōryō no Hako (2008)
 Hidden Fortress: The Last Princess (2008)
 Still Walking (2008)
 The Blue Bird (2008)
 Elevator to the Gallows (2010)
 I Wish (2011)
 A Ghost of a Chance (2011)
 A Yell from Heaven (2011)
 Isoroku (2011) - Tamon Yamaguchi
 The Wings of the Kirin (2012) - Kyōichirō Kaga
 Thermæ Romæ (2012)
 Crow's Thumb aka Karasu no Oyayubi  (2013)
 Before the Vigil (2013)
 Thermae Romae II (2014)
 Zakurozaka no Adauchi (2014)
 Cape Nostalgia (2014)
 Everest: Kamigami no Itadaki (2016) – Jōji Habu
 After the Storm (2016) – Ryōta
 A loving husband (2017) – Yōhei Miyamoto
 Shippu Rondo (2017) – Kazuyuki Kuribayashi
 Umibe No Ria (2017)
 Legend of the Demon Cat (2017) - Nakamaro
 Sakura Guardian in the North (2018)
 The Crimes That Bind (2018) - Kyōichirō Kaga
 Flea-picking Samurai (2018) - Kobayashi Hironoshin
 The Garden of Evening Mists (2019) - Nakamura Aritomo
 In the Wake (2021) - Seiichirō Tomashino
 Hokusai (2021) - Tsutaya Jūzaburō
 Tombi: Father and Son (2022) - Yasuo Ichikawa
 Offbeat Cops (2022)

TV Series

Unmeitōge (1993) - Yagyu Jubei
 Glorious Yorujuro (1996-1997) – Yorujūrō
 Honeymoon Divorce (1997) – Takuya Kitamura
 Yasha (2000) – Ken Kurosaki
 Trick (2000-2003) – Jirō Ueda
 Hero (2001) – Mitsugu Shibayama
 Antique (2001) – Chikage Kobayakawa
 Midnight Rain (2002) – Shunsuke Izumida
 My Little Chef (2002) – Kensaku Tachibana
 The Last Lawyer (2003)
 Rika (2003) – Takao Homma
 Musashi (2003) – Gion Tōji
 Wedding Planner (2003) – Jun Okonogi
 Smile (2003) – Reijirō Sakurai
 Fugitive: Runaway (2004) – Ryūji Mineshima
  (2004) – Kazuyuki Yamamura
 Yoshitsune (2005) – Taira no Tomomori
 Dragon Sakura (2005) – Kenji Sakuragi
 Kekkon Dekinai Otoko (2006) – Shinsuke Kuwano
 Change (2008) – Katsutoshi Nirasawa
 Tenchijin (2009) – Uesugi Kenshin
 Saka no Ue no Kumo (2009-2011) – Akiyama Yoshifuru
 Shiroi Haru (2009) – Haruo Sakura
 Shinzanmono (2010) – Kyōichirō Kaga
 Going My Home (2012) – Tsuboi Ryota
 Downtown Rocket (2015) – Kōhei Tsukuda
 The Sniffer (2016) – Hanaoka
 Downtown Rocket Season 2 (2018) – Kōhei Tsukuda
 Mada Kekkon Dekinai Otoko (2019) – Shinsuke Kuwano
 Dragon Sakura 2 (2021) – Kenji Sakuragi
 DCU: Deep Crime Unit (2022) – Masayoshi Niina
 Because We Forget Everything (2022) – M
 What Will You Do, Ieyasu? (2023) – Takeda Shingen
 Vivant (2023)

Accolades

References

External links

 Official Site 
 

1964 births
Living people
Male actors from Yokohama
Japanese male film actors
Japanese male models
Japanese male stage actors
Japanese male television actors
20th-century Japanese male actors
21st-century Japanese male actors